Juan Rodriguez Cabrillo High School is a high school in Long Beach, California. The school is a part of the Long Beach Unified School District.

History
In the winter of 1996, the ground was broken for Cabrillo High School on the west side of Long Beach. The school opened in September 1996 with grades nine and ten, and a student body of approximately 975 students. Because Cabrillo High School was still under construction, the original plan for the school was that upon completion of their tenth-grade year, all students would transfer to one of the other five comprehensive high schools to complete their secondary education. Efforts by the students and parents instead led to the Board of Education to add grade eleven and eventually grade twelve. In 1999, Cabrillo High School graduated its first class with approximately 75 students receiving their high school diplomas.

Academics
Throughout the years, Cabrillo has seen tremendous instructional changes through multiple 'house' pathways or (Small Learning Community–SLC):

Cabrillo Academy of Global Logistics (AGL)

Cabrillo Academy of Law and Justice (CAL-J)

Cabrillo Engineering and Design (CED)

Specialized Academy of Compute Media, Arts & Animation (SACMAA)

These SLC's are providing Cabrillo students with more options after high school—ranging from college to military (NJROTC) and career opportunities.

College admissions

The Class of 2021 spans throughout California within the California State University and University of California system, although alumni especially committed to universities in Southern California. The most popular destinations within both systems are Long Beach State (54 alumni), UC Santa Barbara (5 alumni), and Cal State Dominguez Hills (3 alumni). Long Beach Cabrillo graduates are granted two years of free tuition at Long Beach City College, which has a dedicated Transfer Admission Guarantee resource center for transferring to the majority of UC and CSU Campuses. Admissions at private universities are sparse, but enrollments have occurred at USC and Cal Lutheran. Below are admissions tables derived from the University of California and California State University for the Class of 2021:

Counselors 
The school has 4 pathways, therefore there are multiple counselors specific for each pathway. Two of the counselors manage 9th graders, and the rest manage 10-12th graders.

Stacie Alexander (Vice Principal)

Steve Duanes (Head Counselor)

R. Lisa Wholey (AGL/CED Counselor 9)

Joel Lovelace (CAL-J/SACMAA Counselor Grade 9)

Karen Kim (CED Counselor Grades 10-12)

John Tran (AGL Counselor Grades 10-12)

Viseth Vann (SACMAA Counselor Grades 10-12)

Luz Romero (CAL-J Counselor Grades 10-12)

Alex Lavayen-Jenkins (Student Success Initiative Site Coordinator)

Trivia 
The school was used as the location for one of the opening scenes from The Fast and the Furious: Tokyo Drift.

During the first season of the television series Glee (TV series), the school was regularly masked as William McKinley High School.

References

External links
 Cabrillo High School

High schools in Long Beach, California
High schools in Los Angeles County, California
Public high schools in California
1996 establishments in California
Educational institutions established in 1996